The Golden Goblet Award for Best Live Action Short Film (Chinese: 金爵奖最佳真人短片) is a highest prize awarded to short films in the live action category of short film competition at the Shanghai International Film Festival since 2017.

Award Winners

References

Lists of films by award
Shanghai International Film Festival